Estigena is a genus of moths in the family Lasiocampidae. It was erected by Frederic Moore in 1860. It is found throughout India, Sri Lanka, the Middle East, Myanmar and Java.

Lepidoptera and Some Other Life Forms considers this name to be a synonym of Gastropacha.

Description
Palpi very long and slender, varying somewhat in length. Antennae with short branches. Legs with very minute spurs. Forewings are long and narrow, outer margin very obliquely rounded. Veins 6, 7 and 8 stalked. Stalk of veins 9 and 10 are long. Hindwings produced and oval in shape. Veins 3, 4 and 5 stalked, whereas vein 8 curved and met by a bar from vein 7. Accessory costal veinlets are numerous and prominent.

Species
Estigena africana
Estigena caesarea
Estigena encausta
Estigena koniensis
Estigena leopoldi
Estigena minima
Estigena pardale
Estigena pelengata
Estigena philippinensis
Estigena prionophora
Estigena silvestris
Estigena wilemani
Estigena xenapates

References

Lasiocampidae